The Singhalese Sports Club (SSC) is a first-class cricket club in Sri Lanka. Singhalese is the most successful club in Sri Lankan domestic cricket, having won the Premier Trophy a record 32 times to 2017. Although the name is correctly spelt with the old spelling "Singhalese", the name is sometimes misspelt with the modern spelling "Sinhalese". Three former Prime Ministers of Sri Lanka have been presidents of the club.

History
In 1899, a combined school cricket team, composed mainly of cricketers from Royal College, S. Thomas' College and Wesley College beat Colts Cricket Club by a one run. The SSC was inaugurated the same year and established as a cricket club by a group of distinguished Ceylonese lawyers, legislators, businessmen, proprietary planters and civil society leaders of that time.

In 1900, the club leased a land in Victoria Park with sandy soil and covered with cinnamon trees. This land was gradually leveled to a cricket ground and its first match was played the following year.  The First President of the Club was Sir Harry Dias, First Hony. Secretary H.J.V.I. Ekanayake, First Treasurer Philip de Silva & First Cricket Captain – O.G. de Alwis. The Club attracted the best school boy players from Royal, S. Thomas’, Wesley, St. Josephs & Trinity.

Club presidents

Honours
 Premier Trophy (32) –  1938–39, 1939–40, 1943–44, 1944–45, 1946–47, 1947–48, 1948–49, 1949–50, 1951–52, 1958–59, 1959–60, 1961–62, 1966–67, 1968–69, 1971–72, 1972–73, 1973–74, 1974–75, 1977–78, 1983–84, 1985–86*, 1986–87, 1988–89*, 1989–90, 1990–91, 1992–93, 1994–95*, 1997–98, 2005–06, 2007–08, 2012–13, 2016–17
(Shared trophies designated a * )

Current squad
Players with international caps are listed in bold

Notable players
Sinhalese players who have represented Sri Lanka in Test, One Day International and Twenty20 International cricket

 Saliya Ahangama
 Marvan Atapattu
 Chamara Silva
 Ashantha de Mel
 Pubudu Dassanayake
 Guy de Alwis
 Roy Dias
 Binura Fernando
 Dilhara Fernando
 Nisal Fernando
 Danushka Gunathilaka
 Avishka Gunawardane
 Asanka Gurusinha
 Dinuka Hettiarachchi
 Mahela Jayawardena
 Dimuth Karunaratne
 Kaushal Lokuarachchi
 Duleep Mendis
 Tharanga Paranavitana
 Ruchira Perera
 Suresh Perera
 Nuwan Pradeep
 Dhammika Prasad
 Arjuna Ranatunga
 Dammika Ranatunga
 Sanjeeva Ranatunga 
 Thilan Samaraweera
 Sachithra Senanayake
 Jayantha Silva
 Kaushal Silva 
 Thilan Thushara
 Mithra Wettimuny
 Sidath Wettimuny
 Pramodya Wickramasinghe
 Piyal Wijetunge
 Nuwan Zoysa

Players who have represented the Singhalese Sports Club in top-level domestic cricket

 Dunil Abeydeera
 Ranil Abeynaike
 Sanka Abeyruwan
 Suraj Abeysekera
 Naresh Adikaram
 Saliya Ahangama
 Geeth Alwis
 Stefan Anthonisz
 Suranga Arunakumara
 Mohamed Aslam
 Marvan Atapattu
 Chaminda Bandara
 Rajitha Basnayake
 Minod Bhanuka
 Sohan Boralessa
 Chaminda Boteju
 N. Buddhasiri
 (wicket-keeper; 2 matches in 1988–89)
 Asitha Costa
 Ian Daniel
 Gehan Dassanayake
 Pubudu Dassanayake
 Guy de Alwis
 Rohan de Silva
 Shamal de Silva
 Kavinda de Thissera
 Ranil Dhammika
 Gagan Dissanayake
 Mahesha Dissanayake
 Samantha Dodanwela
 Gamini Dushantha
 Thilina Embuldeniya
 Binura Fernando
 Chaminda Fernando
 Dilhara Fernando
 Hans Fernando
 Lasith Fernando
 Lilan Fernando
 Milan Fernando
 Muditha Fernando
 Nisal Fernando
 Radhive Fernando
 Sanjaya Fernando
 Sham Fernando
 Upekha Fernando
 Upul Fernando
 Wesley Fernando
 Ruwan Galappathy
 Lahiru Gamage
 Suresh Gunasekera
 Chathupama Gunasinghe
 Danushka Gunathilaka
 Aruna Gunawardene
 Avishka Gunawardene
 Asanka Gurusinha
 Mahinda Halangoda
 Suresh Harding
 Dinuka Hettiarachchi
 Mohamed Iftikhar
 Damith Indika
 Charith Jayampathi
 Mahela Jayawardene
 Prasanna Jayawardene
 Thilina Kandamby
 Chamara Kapugedera
 Dimuth Karunaratne
 Kaushal Lokuarachchi
 Kasun Madushanka
 Gayan Maneshan
 Ushan Manohara
 Duleep Mendis
 Jeevan Mendis
 Manjula Munasinghe
 Tharanga Paranavitana
 Suresh Perera
 Thisara Perera
 Nuwan Pradeep
 Amil Prasad
 Dhammika Prasad
 Brian Rajadurai
 Bhanuka Rajapaksa
 Sanka Ramesh
 Arjuna Ranatunga
 Dammika Ranatunga
 Nishantha Ranatunga
 Sanjeeva Ranatunga
 Suraj Randiv
 Thilan Samaraweera
 Sachithra Senanayake
 Dasun Shanaka
 Chamara Silva
 Jayantha Silva
 Kaushal Silva
 Sanjeewa Silva
 Don Somasiri
 Charith Sylvester
 Chaminda Vidanapathirana
 Hemantha Wickramaratne
 Pramodya Wickramasinghe
 Gayan Wijekoon
 Vishva Wijeratne
 Piyal Wijetunge
 Nuwan Zoysa

References 

 Wisden Cricketers Almanack (annual)

External links
 Singhalese Sports Club website
 CricInfo re Sri Lankan cricket history
 Sinhalese Sports Club at CricketArchive

Sri Lankan first-class cricket teams
Sports clubs in Colombo
Gentlemen's clubs in Sri Lanka
1996 Cricket World Cup stadiums
1899 establishments
1899 establishments in Ceylon
Cricket clubs established in 1899